Giacomo Sozzi was a late-19th century Italian sculptor, active mainly in Lombardy and Bergamo.

He was born in Castione, province of Bergamo. In 1872, he exhibited in Milan: Fanciullo al Bagno. In 1881, in the same city exhibited three stucco statues: Cammilla; Young Bacchante; and Springtime. At the 1883 Fine Art Exposition in Rome, he exhibited a marble statue titled Night before exam; and a bust in marble titled The Wife. These two works were also exhibited in 1884 in Turin, alongside a stucco statue: Cippelli merli. The latter was also exhibited in Milan at the Mostra of 1880. He also sculpted the Monument of Liberty in Piazza Tredici martiri in Lovere.

References

Artists from Bergamo
19th-century Italian sculptors
Italian male sculptors
19th-century Italian male artists